Elections to the Madhya Pradesh Legislative Assembly were held in 1985. The Indian National Congress won a majority of seats and Arjun Singh was sworn in as the new Chief Minister but was forced to resign as Chief Minister after just one day due to differences with Sriniwas Tiwari. Motilal Vora succeeded him as Chief Minister. Arjun Singh was sworn in as the Governor of Punjab after this.

Result 
Source:

Elected Members

References

1985
1985
Madhya Pradesh